= Rang Brown Ni =

Song by Kaptan Laadi Ft. Sapna Choudhary & RDK
- Language: Punjabi
- Published: 09 July 2019
- Genre: Pop, R&B
- Length: 3:55
- Label: TPZ Records
- Composer: Kaptan Laadi
- Lyricist: Asli Gold
- Producers: Kaptan Laadi & RDK

"Rang Brown Ni" is a Punjabi language song sung by Kaptan Laadi. Upon the release the song get captured positive reviews both from the critics and the audience. The video was released on 9 July 2019. it was the Going to the biggest hit of the following year. It has Feature the most popular dancer in India Sapna Choudhary
